Schnals is a comune (municipality) in the autonomous province of South Tyrol in northern Italy, located about  northwest of the city of Bolzano, on the border with Austria. The municipality includes large parts of the Schnalstal.

Geography

Schnals borders the following municipalities: Kastelbell-Tschars, Latsch, Mals, Moos in Passeier, Naturns, Partschins, Schlanders, and Sölden (Austria).

Frazioni
The municipality of Schnals contains the frazioni (subdivisions, mainly villages and hamlets) Karthaus (Certosa), and Katharinaberg (Monte Santa Caterina), Unser Frau (Madonna).

History

Coat-of-arms
The shield is azure and argent party per pale. The first part represents Gabriel of or with a sword in his right hand over the head, and a scales in the left, standing on a sable dragon with a gules tongue. Three azure gyrons, with the point on the division, are in the second part. The shield represents the patron saint of the Carthusian Abbey of Allerengelberg and the arms of the Lords of Schandersberg. The emblem was adopted in 1967.

Society

Linguistic distribution
According to the 2011 census, 98.24% of the population speak German and 1.76% Italian as first language.

Demographic evolution

Images

References

External links
 Tourismboard Val Senales - Schnals Valley
 Homepage of the municipality

Municipalities of South Tyrol